The abbreviation ECEC may refer to:

 East Coast Economic Corridor, an economic corridor covering the east coast of India
 Early Childhood Education and Care, a division of the Department of Education, Queensland, Australia
 Early childhood education and care, a (near) synonym for Early childhood education